Nellore is a city located on the banks of Penna River, in Nellore district of the Indian state of Andhra Pradesh. It serves as the headquarters of the district, as well as Nellore mandal and Nellore revenue division. It is the fourth most populous city in the state. It is at a distance of 700 km from Visakhapatnam and about 170 km north of Chennai, Tamil Nadu and also about 380 km east-northeast of Bangalore, Karnataka.

Etymology 
There are various theories linked to the origin of the name "Nellore". A mythological story from Sthala Purana depicts, a lingam in the form of a stone under nelli tree ("Nelli" stands for emblica Tree in Tamil). The place gradually became Nelli-ooru (ooru generally stands for place in Telugu) and then to present day Nellore. Another explanation is that the town got its name from the extensive cultivation of paddy in and around it ("Nell"  meaning paddy in Telugu). The Gazetteer of the Nellore District considers the latter the more plausible etymology.

History 
Nellore had been under the rule of  Mauryas, Satavahanas, Cholas, Pallavas, Pandyas, Kharavela of Chedi dynasty, Kakatiyas, Eastern Gangas of Kalinga Empire, Vijayanagara Empire, Arcot Nawabs and other dynasties.

Nellore was ruled by Ashoka of the Mauryan dynasty in the 3rd century BCE. Nellore was conquered by the rulers of the Pallava dynasty and it was under their rule till the 6th century CE, subsequently the Chola rulers ruled Nellore for a long period of time. The Cholas met their decline in the 13th century CE. Tamil inscriptions indicate that it formed part of Chola kingdom till their decline in the thirteenth century CE. It later became a part of Kakatiyas, Vijayanagara Empire, Sultanate of Golconda, Mughal Empire and Arcot Nawabdom. In the 18th century, Nellore was taken over by the British from the Arcot Nawabs and was part of the Madras Presidency of British India.

History under British Rule as Madras Presidency
The first account was by produced by John Boswell in 1873 as collector. This report by the British Includes Climate, agriculture, health statistics as well important taxation information. Social structure including important families of Nellore from the 1800s. These included Venketagiri Raja, kalhastri Rajah, The Chundi Zamindhar, The Mutiyalpad Zamindhar, Sayidapur Zamindhar, Jupalli Zamindhars of Udayagiri, Udayagiri Jaghirediar, the Vazella Zamidhars of Gudur, Zamindhars of Ongole, Turrawar Poligar, Tadeboyina Polighar, The Chettiars Polighar, The Udathawar Polighar, The Gangulawar Poighar and Buchireddypalem Family. These families under the British Raj were responsible for the villages and lands in their possession. The British recognized the importance of Nellore in cultivation as well as important port of Krishnapatam. 
The city had an important role in the emergence of the Telugu language and the formation of the state of Andhra Pradesh. Potti Sriramulu, who fasted until death for the formation of Andhra Pradesh, hailed from Nellore.

Geography

Location 

Climate 

The climate of Nellore city can be placed under Tropical Savanna climate category  according to Köppen climate classification which has hot and  humid summers and warm winters. April and May are the hottest months and the hot conditions generally last until the end of the June. December, January and February are the coolest months. Humidity level in the city is high due to its proximity to the coast. Nellore does not receive the south-west monsoon. Rainfall in Nellore occurs between the months of October and December due to the north-east monsoon. This period gives about 60 percent of the city's annual rainfall. Cyclones are common in the city during this period, causing floods and havoc.

The maximum temperature is  during summer and the minimum temperature is  during winter. The rainfall ranges from  through South West and North East Monsoons. Nellore is subject both to droughts and to floods based on the seasons.

Demographics 

 census, Nellore city had a population of 505,258. The average literacy rate stands at 83.59% (male 87.53%; female 79.52%) with 387,192 literates, significantly higher than the state average of 73.00%. The expanded city population post merger of 15 gram panchayats into Nellore Municipal
Corporation stands at 631,791

Governance 

Civic administration

Nellore Municipal Corporation was constituted as a municipality on 1 November 1866 by the Madras District Municipality Act. In 2013, fifteen gram panchayats namely, Allipuram, Ambhapuram, Buja Buja Nellore, Chinthareddypalem, Gudupallipadu, Gundlapalem, Kallurupalli, Kanaparthypadu, Kodurupadu, Narayanareddypeta, Navalakulathota, Nellore Bit-I (Kothuru), Peddacherukuru, Pottipalem, Vavilatepadhu were merged into the municipal corporation. Present mayor of the city is Abdul Aziz.

The city is one among the 31 cities in the state to be a part of water supply and sewerage services mission known as Atal Mission for Rejuvenation and Urban Transformation (AMRUT).

Politics

Nellore is represented by Nellore City assembly constituency and Nellore Rural assembly constituency for Andhra Pradesh Legislative Assembly. Anil Kumar Poluboina is the present MLA of Nellore City assembly constituency representing YSRCP. Kotamreddy Sridhar Reddy is the present MLA of Nellore Rural assembly constituency representing YSRCP.

Culture 

The residents of the city are generally referred as Nelloreans. The Rottela Panduga (Roti festival) is an annual urs event celebrated at the Bara Shaheed Dargah (shrine of twelve martyrs) on the banks of Swarnala Cheruvu. The event got its name after the practice of exchanging flat breads and attracts visitors from all religious backgrounds every year and from all over the country and also from foreign countries.

Cuisine 
Chepala Pulusu (fish curry) is a non-vegetarian recipe of the Nellore district, prepared from Korramennu. Malai Kaja Nellore Famous Sweet is a local sweet made from maida, milk and sugar.

Transport 

Local transport in the city include, two, three and four wheelers. Of these, privately operated auto rickshaws accounts to around 7,000, dominating most part of the city for local commuting. Nellore bus station of the city operates district and long-distance services.  is classified as an A grade and Adarsh station in the Vijayawada railway division of South Central Railway zone. There is also a proposal to build a no frills airport for the city.

The proposed Outer Ring Road, existing arterial and internal roads helps reduce traffic congestion. The city is connected with major National highways such as, National Highway 16, a part of Asian Highway 45 and Golden Quadrilateral, bypasses the city.

Education 
The primary and secondary school education is imparted by government, aided and private schools of the School Education Department of the state. The medium of instruction followed by different schools are English, Telugu.

Media 
Zaminryot newspaper, established in 1930, and Lawyer weekly newspaper are based out of Nellore. In addition, Eenadu, Vaartha AndhraJyothy and Sakshi newspapers are also printing local editions in Nellore.

Notable people 
 

 Acharya Aatreya, playwright, poet
 S. P. Balasubrahmanyam, playback singer
 Venkatesh Geriti, political activist
 Nagabhushanam, Telugu actor
 Venkaiah Naidu, Vice President of India
 Rajanala Kaleswara Rao, Telugu actor
 Ramana Reddy, Telugu actor/comedian
 Sri Potti Sreeramulu, Indian Freedom Fighter
 Puchalapalli Sundarayya
 Tikkana, poet, one of the "Trinity of Poets"
 Vanisri, actress

See also 
 List of Urban Agglomerations in Andhra Pradesh
 List of municipal corporations in India#Andhra Pradesh

References

External links 

 
Cities in Andhra Pradesh
District headquarters of Andhra Pradesh
Towns in Nellore district